The Amherst Ramblers are a Junior A Hockey League team based in Amherst, Nova Scotia.  The team is a member of the Maritime Hockey League and are in the EastLink South Division.  All home games are played out of the 2,500 seat Amherst Stadium.  The season usually runs from mid-September to mid March every year.

History
The Amherst Ramblers were founded in 1966 as the Berwick Shell Junior Bruins, and were founding members of the "Metro Valley Junior Hockey League". The league, then a junior B league, was eventually renamed the Maritime Junior A Hockey League. In 1967 the Bruins were relocated to Amherst and renamed the Amherst Ramblers.

The Ramblers have been known by two different names since moving to Amherst. Between 1994 and 1998 the team was known as the Moosheads.  The logo consisted of a large letter "A" and the moose from Moosehead beer - similar in design to the current Halifax Mooseheads logo.

The Ramblers are known to draw some of the largest crowds in the Maritime Hockey League, and have placed third in average attendance the last few years, only behind the Yarmouth Mariners and the Weeks Crushers.

The Ramblers hosted the Centennial Cup (now known as Royal Bank Cup) in 1993, and they also hosted the Fred Page Cup in 2019.

Season-by-season record

Fred Page Cup
The Ramblers competed in their 1st ever Fred Page Cup in 2019. They came 3rd.

Eastern Canada Championships
MHL - QAAAJHL - CCHL - Host
Round robin play with 2nd vs 3rd in semi-final to advance against 1st in the finals.

Notable alumni
Bill Riley
Mal Davis
Joey MacDonald
Bill Chapman
Mark Lee
Keith Blenkhorn
Zack MacEwen

See also
List of ice hockey teams in Nova Scotia

External links 
Amherst Ramblers
Maritime Junior A Hockey League

Maritime Junior Hockey League teams
Ice hockey teams in Nova Scotia
Amherst, Nova Scotia
1966 establishments in Nova Scotia
Ice hockey clubs established in 1966